The 316th Operations Group (316 OG) is the flying component of the Air Force District of Washington 316th Wing, stationed at Andrews Air Force Base, Maryland. It provides rotary-wing contingency response support capability to the United States National Capital Region while also supporting regional and global customers with critical airfield infrastructure and aviation services. The group consists of two squadrons of aircrew and support personnel.

Its World War II predecessor unit, the 316th Troop Carrier Group was a highly decorated C-47 Skytrain unit that served with Ninth and Twelfth Air Force in the European and the Mediterranean theaters. As part of Operation Avalanche, the Allied invasion of Italy, the 316th dropped paratroops over the beachhead south of the Sele River on the night of 14 September 1943. Later during Operation Overlord, the Allied invasion of France, the group dropped paratroops near Ste-Mere-Eglise a few hours before the main landings on 6 June 1944. It also dropped paratroops and released gliders carrying reinforcements during the airborne invasion of the Netherlands, Operation Market-Garden in September 1944. By the end of the war, the 316th Troop Carrier Group was awarded three Distinguished Unit Citations.

Overview
The group oversees the operations of the 1st Helicopter Squadron and the 316th Operations Support Squadron.

The 1st Helicopter Squadron supports Washington D.C. capital area airlift for the Executive Branch, high-ranking dignitaries, high-ranking military leaders and other VIPs. It operates Bell UH-1N Hueys.

The 316th Operations Support Squadron provides the necessary aviation related support infrastructure and services for the Group and the 25 other tenant flying units on Andrews AFB.

History
 See the 316th Wing for additional history and lineage

World War II

Trained with I Troop Carrier Command with C-47 and C-53 aircraft. Moved to the Mediterranean theater, assigned to Ninth Air Force, and began operations in November 1942. Flew combat missions in North Africa Egypt/Libya campaign. Transported supplies and evacuated casualties in support of the Allied drive across North Africa.

In February 1943 the 316th TCG became a part of the 52nd Troop Carrier Wing of the Northwest African Troop Carrier Command in the official Allied air force organization in the Mediterranean Theater of Operations (MTO). In May 1943, the group began training for the invasion of Sicily where they dropped paratroopers over the assault area on the night of 9 July, and carried reinforcements on 11 July, receiving DUC for carrying out that mission although severely attacked by ground and naval forces. They received another DUC for supporting aerial and ground operations in Egypt, Libya, Tunisia, and Sicily, 25 November 1942 – 25 August 1943, by transporting reinforcements and supplies. During this period, the group was under the command of Colonel Jerome McCauley.

The 316th was assigned to Twelfth AF and moved to Sicily to take part in the invasion of Italy, where it dropped paratroops over the beachhead south of the Sele River on the night of 14 September 1943. They transported cargo in the theater until February 1944, then joined Ninth AF in England and prepared for the invasion of France.

The unit dropped paratroops near Ste-Mere-Eglise on D—Day 1944 and flew a reinforcement mission on 7 June, receiving a third DUC for these operations. During Operation Market Garden, they dropped paratroops and released gliders carrying reinforcements. Again they dropped paratroops near Wesel on 24 March 1945 when the Allies made the airborne assault across the Rhine. They also provided transport services in Europe while not engaged in airborne operations, hauling supplies such as ammunition, gasoline, water, and rations; along with evacuating wounded personnel to rear-zone hospitals.

Cold War
Returned to the US in May 1945. Trained with C-47 C-82 and later C-119 aircraft as part of Tactical Air Command.

Transferred, without personnel and equipment, to Japan on 15 November 1954. Assigned to Far East Air Forces, manned, and equipped with C-119s and performed theater airlift missions primarily to Japan, Okinawa, Philippines and South Korea. Inactivated in 1957.

Modern era
Activated in 2006 to be operational flying component of AFDW 316th Wing in Washington D.C. area., inactivated in 2010, reactivated in 2020.

Lineage
 Constituted as 316th Transport Group on 2 February 1942
 Activated on 14 February 1942
 Redesignated 316th Troop Carrier Group in July 1942
 Redesignated 316th Troop Carrier Group (Medium) in June 1948
 Redesignated 316th Troop Carrier Group (Heavy) in October 1949
 Redesignated 316th Troop Carrier Group (Medium) in January 1950
 Inactivated 18 June 1957
 Redesignated 316th Tactical Airlift Group (Provisional) on 1 October 1978
 Inactivated on 1 October 1989, personnel and equipment reassigned to the 374th Airlift Wing
 Activated as 316th Airlift Support Group on 1 April 1992
 Inactivated on 30 June 1994
 Redesignated 316th Operations Group, and activated on 22 June 2006
 Inactivated on 1 October 2010
 Activated on 11 June 2020

Assignments

 Air Transport (Later I Troop Carrier) Command, 14 February-12 November 1942
 Attached to: 53d Troop Carrier Wing, 14 February-12 November 1942
 Ninth Air Force, 23 November 1942
 Twelfth Air Force, 9 May 1943
 IX Troop Carrier Command, 15 February 1944 – May 1945
 Tactical Air Command, 25 May 1945

 Third Air Force, 21 May 1946
 316th Troop Carrier Wing, 15 August 1947 – 25 August 1948; 25 August 1948
 Third Air Force, 20 October 1949
 Eighteenth Air Force, 7 March 1951 – 15 November 1954
 315th Air Division, 15 November 1954 – 18 June 1957
 374th Tactical Airlift Wing, 1 October 1978 – 1 October 1989
 Twenty-Second Air Force, 1 April 1992 - 30 June 1994
 316th Wing, 22 June 2006 – 1 October 2010, 11 June 2020 - Present

Components
 1st Helicopter Squadron, 22 June 2006 – 1 November 2010
 316th Operations Support Squadron, 22 June 2006 – 1 November 2010
 19th Airlift Squadron, 1 April 1992 - 1 June 1992
 20th Aeromedical Airlift Squadron, 1 April 1992 - 1 June 1992
 16th Troop Carrier Squadron: 5 October 1950 – 15 November 1954
 36th Troop Carrier Squadron (4C): 14 February 1942 – 18 June 1957
 37th Troop Carrier Squadron (W7): 14 February 1942 – 18 June 1957
 38th Troop Carrier Squadron: 14 February-19 May 1942
 44th Troop Carrier Squadron (6E): 14 February 1942 – May 1945
 45th Troop Carrier Squadron (T3): 14 February 1942 – May 1945
 75th Troop Carrier Squadron: 11 December 1945 – 1949, 20 December 1952 – 18 June 1957
 77th Troop Carrier Squadron: 11 December 1945 – 10 June 1946

Stations

 Patterson Field, Ohio, 14 February 1942
 Bowman Field, Kentucky, 17 June 1942
 Lawson Field, Georgia, 9 August 1942
 Del Valle Army Airbase, Texas, 29 September-12 November 1942
 RAF Deversoir, Egypt, 23 November 1942
 RAF El Adem, Egypt, to December 1942
 RAF Fayid, Egypt, January 1943
 Nouvion Airfield, Algeria, 9 May 1943
 Guercif Airfield, French Morocco, 29 May 1943
 Enfidaville Airfield, Tunisia, 21 June 1943

 Mazzara Airfield, Sicily, 3 September 1943
 Borizzo Airfield, Sicily, 18 October 1943 – 12 February 1944
 RAF Cottesmore (AAF-489), England, 15 February 1944 – May 1945
 Pope Field, North Carolina, 25 May 1945
 Greenville Army Air Base, South Carolina, 25 August 1947
 Smyrna AFB (later Sewart AFB), Tennessee, 4 November 1949
 Ashiya AB, Japan, 15 November 1954 – 18 June 1957
 Yokota Air Base, Japan, 1 October 1978 – 1 October 1989, 1 April 1992 - 30 June 1994
 Andrews AFB (later Joint Base Andrews), Maryland, 22 June 2006 – 1 October 2010, 11 June 2020 - present

Aircraft assigned
 C-47 Skytrain, 1942–1950
 C-53 Skytrain, 1942–1950
 C-82 Packet, 1945–1954
 C-119 Flying Boxcar, 1949–1954; 1954–1957
 UH-1 Huey, 2006–1 Nov 2010

References

 Maurer, Maurer (1983). Air Force Combat Units of World War II. Maxwell AFB, Alabama: Office of Air Force History. .
 Ravenstein, Charles A. (1984). Air Force Combat Wings Lineage and Honors Histories 1947–1977. Maxwell AFB, Alabama: Office of Air Force History. .
 D-Day Aircraft Invasion Stripes

External links
 
 The 316th Troop Carrier Group

Military units and formations established in 1942
Operations groups of the United States Air Force
1942 establishments in Ohio